Cotabato Manobo (Dulangan Manobo) is a Manobo language spoken in Mindanao, the Philippines. Dialects include Tasaday and Blit.

Distribution
Cotabato Manobo is spoken in the Kalamansig, Palimbang, and Ninoy Aquino municipalities of Sultan Kudarat Province and the T'Boli municipality of South Cotabato Province.

Phonology

Vowels

For some speakers it may also be realized as  before or after  when not word-initial.

Consonants

See also

Lumad

References

Further reading

 

Manobo languages
Languages of Cotabato